Bonneval Abbey was founded as a monastery of Cistercian monks in Le Cayrol, in the department of Aveyron, in the south of France. It is now inhabited by Trappistine nuns.

History
Bonneval Abbey was founded in 1147 by Cistercian monks from Mazan Abbey, in Rouergue. Its name means "good valley", a typical Cistercian name. Bonneval quickly became a rich and powerful abbey, owning extensive estates throughout the country.

In the mid-14th century it suffered from the Black Death and underwent much damage and loss during the Hundred Years' War, as the Rouergue was given to the English in 1360 by the Treaty of Brétigny. Towns and abbeys were looted, and Bonneval, although fortified, was unable to keep out the English troops and the bands of marauding French bandits.

A long period of decadence followed. Nevertheless, Bonneval was chosen in the 17th century to educate novices from every Cistercian abbey in southwest France. During the French Revolution, in 1791, the 13 remaining monks had to leave. The abbey and its goods were sold off, and the buildings subsequently quarried for stone.

Today
In 1875, Trappist nuns came to rebuild the abbey. They also opened a chocolate factory, and installed a turbine on the river to produce electricity. In 1902, they founded what is now known as Bon-Conseil Abbey, in Quebec, Canada.

Today, the community at Bonneval consists of 30 nuns, aged from 29 to 98. They still produce a well-known chocolate, but above all they endeavour to fulfill their vocation of prayer.

Notes

Sources/ External links 

 Bonneval Abbey website 
Abbayes en France: Bonneval 
Cistercian Order of the Strict Observance official website (Trappists)
Main Reference: Cartulaire de l'Abbaye de Bonneval, P.-A. Verlaguet ed., Rodez, Carrère, 1938.

1147 establishments in Europe
1140s establishments in France
1875 establishments in France
1791 disestablishments in France
Trappistine monasteries in France
Cistercian monasteries in France
Christian monasteries established in the 12th century
19th-century Christian monasteries
Catholic Church in France
Monasteries destroyed during the French Revolution
Buildings and structures in Aveyron
19th-century Roman Catholic church buildings in France
12th-century Roman Catholic church buildings in France